Diogo Pereira Mateus (born Lisbon, February 7, 1980) is a Portuguese rugby union player. He played as a centre.

He came through the ranks at Belenenses (after a stint at "Clube dos TLP"), he was on the books with Heineken Cup champions Munster in the 2006/07 season. He is 1.75 m tall and weighs 93 kg. He has a twin brother David Mateus, who was also a rugby player.

He had 75 caps for Portugal, from 2000 to 2010, scoring 15 tries and 1 penalty, 78 points on aggregate. He was called for the 2007 Rugby World Cup, playing in three games and remaining scoreless.

He was also a notable 7's player, being captain of the Portuguese national Sevens rugby team.

References

External links
Diogo Mateus International Statistics

1980 births
Living people
Portuguese rugby union players
Rugby union centres
Portuguese twins
Twin sportspeople
Portugal international rugby sevens players
Male rugby sevens players
Rugby union players from Lisbon
Munster Rugby players
Portugal international rugby union players